The Battle of Villafranca del Bierzo took place on 17 March 1809, during the French occupation of León in the Peninsular War. After a bloody four-hour siege the small and isolated French garrison at Villafranca surrendered to Spanish regulars under Brigadier José de Mendizábal and General Pedro Caro, 3rd Marquis of la Romana.

Background
In 1809 Spanish military operations in northern Spain were marked by sporadic efforts to expel Marshal Ney's French VI Corps from the provinces it had overrun following the collapse of the Spanish armies the previous year. Fragments of the armies torn-apart by the French, operating in conjunction with some 30,000 guerrillas and militia, prowled the coasts of Galicia and Asturias, raiding and skirmishing with Ney's 17,000 troops. Garrisoning the hostile region ate up most of Ney's resources, and in March 1809, the French evacuated Vigo and Tuy and withdrew from guerrilla-infested southern Galicia.

One remaining Spanish formation, General Pedro Caro, 3rd Marquis of la Romana's division of regular infantry, established itself in Asturias and harassed the French in León and Galicia, capturing Imperial troops and supplies with impunity. In March, elements of the unit, armed with a French 12-pound gun and munitions recovered from an abandoned post at Ponferrada, struck at French communications with Madrid by attacking the French post at Villafranca.

The battle
The vanguard of the attack was formed of some 1,500 men of the Zaragoza and Zamora regiments under Mendizábal. On the 17 March they entered the plaza at Villafranca and closed in on the French entrenched in the castle. A costly battle broke out that claimed the lives of several Spanish officers. After four hours of fighting the French agreed to surrender.

One authority credited General La Romana with 3,800 Spanish troops and six artillery pieces. This force included two battalions each of the Princesa and Asturias Infantry Regiments. The 1,200-man French force included one battalion of the 6th Light Infantry Regiment plus several hundred sick and wounded soldiers. The French lost 700 killed and wounded plus another 574 unwounded men captured. Spanish losses are not known. A second historian wrote that the Spanish had 6,000 men.

Notes

References

Further reading

External links

Battles of the Peninsular War
Battles involving Spain
Battles in Castile and León
Battle of Villafranca (1809)
Battle of Villafranca (1809)
March 1809 events
History of the province of León